Asteropeia rhopaloides is a species of plant in the Asteropeiaceae family. It is endemic to Madagascar.  Its natural habitat is subtropical or tropical moist lowland forests. It is threatened by habitat loss.

References

Endemic flora of Madagascar
rhopaloides
Endangered plants
Taxonomy articles created by Polbot
Taxa named by Henri Ernest Baillon
Taxa named by John Gilbert Baker
Flora of the Madagascar lowland forests
Flora of the Madagascar subhumid forests